Association football, more commonly known as football or soccer, has been included Afro-Asian Games in since the first edition in 2003 as a men's competition sport.

Tournaments

External links
Afro-Asian Games - rsssf.com

 
Afro-Asian Games
Afro-Asian Games
Afro-Asian Games